SCY may refer to:

San Cristóbal Airport, Ecuador, IATA airport code
Short course yards, in competitive swimming
South Croydon railway station, London, National Rail station code
Supreme Court of Yukon, the court of general jurisdiction for the Canadian territory of Yukon